Dach (literally "roof" in the Polish and German language) is a Polish and German topographical surname for a settler on clayey soil and may refer to:

Carson Dach (born 1980), American football player
Hans von Dach (1927–2003), Swiss military theorist
Kirby Dach (born 2001), Canadian ice hockey player
Leslie Dach, American businessman
Lorne Dach (born 1958), Canadian politician
Simon Dach (1605–1659), Prussian lyrical poet and hymnwriter

See also
 Dach (disambiguation)

References 

German-language surnames
Polish-language surnames